Daniil Sergeyevich Odoyevsky (born 22 January 2003) is a Russian football player who plays for FC Zenit Saint Petersburg.

Club career
He made his debut in the Russian Premier League for FC Zenit Saint Petersburg on 16 May 2021 in a game against FC Tambov.

Honours

Club
Zenit Saint Petersburg
Russian Premier League: 2020–21, 2021–22
 Russian Super Cup: 2022

Career statistics

Club

References

External links
 
 

2003 births
Footballers from Saint Petersburg
Living people
Russian footballers
Russia youth international footballers
Association football goalkeepers
FC Zenit-2 Saint Petersburg players
FC Zenit Saint Petersburg players
Russian Second League players
Russian Premier League players